Statistics of the Hungarian football league Nemzeti Bajnokság I in the 1947–48 season.

Overview
It was contested by 17 teams, and Csepel SC won the championship.

League standings

Results

Statistical leaders

Top goalscorers

References
Hungary - List of final tables (RSSSF)

Nemzeti Bajnokság I seasons
Hun
1947–48 in Hungarian football